Julian Sidney Rumsey (April 3, 1823 in Batavia, New York – April 20, 1886 in Chicago, Illinois) served as mayor of Chicago, Illinois (1861–1862) for the Republican Party.

Career
Rumsey arrived in Chicago on July 28, 1835, to work in a shipping company owned by his uncles.
He and his brother subsequently became partners. This firm, then known as Newberry and Dole, sent out the first shipment of grain from Chicago in September 1839. In 1852 Dole retired, and the firm, which was for a time known as Rumsey Brothers, devoted itself exclusively to the grain commission business.

Rumsey was identified with the history of Chicago for more than half a century. During that period he was mayor, county treasurer, and president of the Chicago Board of Trade. He was a charter member of the Board of Trade, and through his efforts the present system of grain inspection and grading was adopted. This achievement gave him the title of the "Father of Grain Inspection."

Rumsey always took an interest in national and state politics.

Mayoralty
In 1861, Rumsey was elected mayor of Chicago, defeating Democratic nominee Thomas Barbour Bryan. Running for mayor during the period that preceded the Civil War, he did much to arouse the enthusiasm of his fellow citizens in favor of the preservation of the Union, and at the mass meeting in Metropolitan Hall a few days after the firing on Fort Sumter, he delivered a stirring address.

He was sworn in as mayor on May 6, 1861.

His mayoralty ended on May 5, 1862, when he was succeeded in office by Democrat Francis Cornwall Sherman.

Post-mayoralty
He was a member of the first war finance committee, and of the Republican state committee the same year. During the Panic of 1873 he was president of the Corn Exchange National Bank.

He is buried in Graceland Cemetery.

Memorials
Rumsey Avenue, which runs NE/SW between the intersections of 87th St. & Pulaski and 85th St. & Hamlin, on Chicago's far Southwest Side, is named for him.

References

External links

Inaugural Address

1823 births
1886 deaths
Burials at Graceland Cemetery (Chicago)
Mayors of Chicago
Illinois Republicans
19th-century American politicians